FK Družstevník Plavnica is a Slovak association football club located in Plavnica. It currently plays in Majstrovstvá regiónu (4th level).

Colors and badge
Its colors are blue and white.

References

External links
Official website 

Football clubs in Slovakia
Association football clubs established in 1951
1951 establishments in Slovakia